Lieutenant Colonel Miguel de la Peña (February 17, 1919 in San Antonio – September 16, 2012 in San Antonio) was a United States Army officer and one of the first American officers of Hispanic origins in the United States Special Forces.

De la Peña joined the Army during World War II and fought from Normandy through to Czechoslovakia. He also fought in both the Korean War and Vietnam War. He retired from the Army in 1967.

Notes

References

Further reading
 — includes a link to a video interview of Mr. de la Peña in San Antonio, Texas, on October 25, 2003, by Rajesh Redd.
 cites "Miguel de la Pena, Veritas", Joe Stringham, The Drop, Bob Hand, University of Texas Oral History.

1919 births
2012 deaths
Military personnel from San Antonio
United States Army officers
United States Army Special Operations Command